Molla Vali may refer to:
 Molla Vali-ye Valeh, Afghanistan
 Molla Vali, Hamadan, Iran
 Molla Vali, Khuzestan, Iran